Henry Oliver (1865–1965) was a British naval officer.

Henry Oliver may also refer to:

Henry Oliver (athlete) (1902–1995), British middle-distance runner
Harry Oliver (footballer) (Henry Spoors Oliver, 1921–1994), English footballer
Henry Oliver (MP), MP for Bedford
Henry K. Oliver (1800–1885), Massachusetts politician
Henry W. Oliver (1840–1904), American industrialist

See also

Harry Oliver (disambiguation)
Oliver Henry (disambiguation)